Latvia participated in the XI Summer Paralympic Games in Sydney, Australia.

Medalists

See also
Latvia at the Paralympics
Latvia at the 2000 Summer Olympics

External links
International Paralympic Committee
Latvian Paralympic Committee

Nations at the 2000 Summer Paralympics
2000
Paralympics